Federal holidays in the United States are the eleven calendar dates that are designated by the U.S. government as holidays. During U.S. federal holidays, non-essential federal government offices are closed and federal government employees are paid for the holiday.

Federal holidays are designated by the United States Congress in Title V of the United States Code. Congress only has authority to create holidays for federal institutions (including federally-owned properties), employees, and the District of Columbia. Although not required, as a general rule of courtesy, other institutions, such as banks, businesses, schools, and the stock market, may be closed on federal holidays. In various parts of the country, state and city holidays may be observed concurrently with federal holidays.

History
The history of federal holidays in the United States dates back to June 28, 1870, when Congress created federal holidays "to correspond with similar laws of States around the District...and...in every State of the Union."  Although at first applicable only to federal employees in the District of Columbia, Congress extended coverage in 1885 to all federal employees.

The original four holidays in 1870 were:

 New Year's Day
 Independence Day
 Thanksgiving Day
 Christmas Day

George Washington's Birthday became a federal holiday in 1879. In 1888 and 1894, respectively, Decoration Day (now Memorial Day) and Labor Day were created. Armistice Day was established in 1938 to honor the end of World War I, and the scope of the holiday was expanded to honor Americans who fought in World War II and the Korean War when it was renamed Veterans Day in 1954.

In 1968, the Uniform Monday Holiday Act gave several holidays "floating" dates so that they always fall on a Monday, and also established Columbus Day.

In 1983, Ronald Reagan signed Martin Luther King Jr. Day into law, and it was first observed three years later, although some states resisted. It was finally celebrated by all 50 states in 2000.

Christmas Day as a federal or public holiday is sometimes objected to by various sources, usually due to its ties with Christianity. In December 1999, the Western Division of the United States District Court for the Southern District of Ohio, in the case Ganulin v. United States, denied the charge that Christmas Day's federal status violated the Establishment Clause of the Constitution, ruling that "the Christmas holiday has become largely secularized", and that "by giving federal employees a paid vacation day on Christmas, the government is doing no more than recognizing the cultural significance of the holiday".

On June 17, 2021, Joe Biden signed legislation making Juneteenth a federal holiday, commemorating the emancipation of enslaved African Americans.

List of federal holidays 
Most of the 11 U.S. federal holidays are also state holidays. A holiday that falls on a weekend is usually observed on the closest weekday (e.g. a holiday falling on a Saturday is observed on the preceding Friday, while a holiday falling on a Sunday is observed on the succeeding Monday).  The official names come from the statute that defines holidays for federal employees.

New Year's Day, Juneteenth, Independence Day, Veterans Day, and Christmas Day are observed on the same calendar date each year, irrespective of the day of the week. For floating holidays, when a holiday falls on a Saturday, federal employees who work Monday to Friday observe the holiday on the previous Friday. Federal employees who work on Saturday observe the holiday on Saturday and, for them, Friday is a regular work day. Holidays that fall on a Sunday are observed by federal workers the following Monday.

Inauguration Day, held on January 20 every four years following a quadrennial presidential election, is considered a paid holiday for federal employees in the Washington, D.C., area by the Office of Personnel Management. However, it is not considered a federal holiday in the United States equivalent to the eleven holidays mentioned above.

Although many states recognize most or all federal holidays as state holidays, the federal government cannot enact laws to compel them to do so.  Furthermore, states can recognize other days as state holidays that are not federal holidays.  For example, the State of Texas recognizes all federal holidays except Columbus Day, and in addition recognizes the Friday after Thanksgiving, Christmas Eve, and the day after Christmas as state holidays.  Furthermore, Texas does not follow the federal rule of closing either the Friday before if a holiday falls on a Saturday, or the Monday after if a holiday falls on a Sunday (offices are open on those Fridays or Mondays), but does have "partial staffing holidays" (such as March 2, which is Texas Independence Day) and "optional holidays" (such as Good Friday).

Private employers also are not required to observe federal or state holidays, the key exception being federally-chartered banks. Some private employers, often by a union contract, pay a differential such as time-and-a-half or double-time to employees who work on some federal holidays. Employees not specifically covered by a union contract, however, might only receive their standard pay for working on a federal holiday, depending on the company policy.

Legal holidays due to presidential proclamation 

Federal law also provides for the declaration of other public holidays by the President of the United States. Generally the president will provide a reasoning behind the elevation of the day, and call on the people of the United States to observe the day "with appropriate ceremonies and activities." Examples of presidentially declared holidays were the days of the funerals for former Presidents Ronald Reagan, George H. W. Bush, and Gerald Ford; federal government offices were closed and employees given a paid holiday.

Proposed federal holidays
Many federal holidays have been proposed. As the U.S. federal government is a large employer, the holidays are expensive. If a holiday is controversial, opposition will generally prevent bills enacting them from passing. For example, Martin Luther King Jr. Day, marking King's birthday, took much effort to pass and for all states to recognize it. It was not until 2000 that this holiday was officially observed in all 50 states.

The following list is an example of holidays that have been proposed and reasons why they are not observed at the federal level. Some of these holidays are observed at the state level.

Controversy
Protests by the Native American community support the abolition of Columbus Day, mainly due to its ideology in forcefully conquering and converting whole populations with another and encouraging imperialism and colonization. Glenn Morris of The Denver Post wrote that Columbus Day "... is not merely a celebration of Columbus the man; it is the celebration of a racist legal and political legacy—embedded in official legal and political pronouncements of the U.S.—such as the doctrine of discovery and manifest destiny." Alaska, Florida, Hawaii, Iowa, Louisiana, Maine, Minnesota, New Mexico, Nevada, North Carolina, Oregon, South Dakota, Washington, and Wisconsin do not recognize Columbus Day, though other states such as Hawaii and South Dakota mark the day with an alternative holiday or observance. South Dakota is the only state to recognize Native American Day as an alternate. Hawaii recognizes Discoverer's Day. Other states such as Maine, Nevada, Vermont, Washington and Wisconsin instead recognize Indigenous Peoples' Day as an alternative holiday.

See also 

 List of observances in the United States by presidential proclamation
 Public holidays in the United States

References

External links
 Federal Holidays: Evolution and Application, CRS Report for Congress, 98-301 GOV, updated February 8, 1999, by Stephen W. Stathis
 United States Code: Federal Holidays (5 USC 6103)
 Official US Federal Holiday calendar
 US Federal holiday and special occasions calendar
 National Holidays in USA

 
federal
Federal government of the United States